Southern Man may refer to:

 Nanman or Southern Man, ancient ethnic groups in South China
 Southern man, New Zealand stereotype
 "Southern Man" (song), by Neil Young
 A man from the Southern United States.

See also
 Southerner (disambiguation)